Zhenzhu Subdistrict is a subdistrict in Zhen'an District, Dandong, Liaoning, China. , it administers the following four residential communities and one village: 
Dongsheng Community
Linjiang Community
Zhen'an Community
Zhenshan Community
Linjiang Village

See also 
 List of township-level divisions of Liaoning

References 

Township-level divisions of Liaoning
Dandong